The Rangacharlu Memorial Hall, commonly known as Mysore Town Hall and colloquially referred to simply as the Town Hall, is a Neoclassical-styled public building that was constructed in 1884 in memory of the 14th Diwan of Mysore Sir C. V. Rungacharlu.

The construction was sponsored by Maharaja Chamarajendra Wadiyar X. Rungacharlu's successor Diwan Sir K. Sheshadri Iyer was the building's chief engineer and planner.

See also
List of Heritage Buildings in Mysore

References

Buildings and structures in Mysore